Vicente Valcarce Cano (born 19 October 1974 in Arrecife, Canary Islands) is a Spanish retired footballer who played as a left back.

Football career
After playing two years with the club's youth system, Valcarce started his professional career with Real Madrid, but never moved past the reserves. In the 1998–99 season he joined Málaga CF, helping the Andalusia team to a La Liga promotion in his first year and proceeding to be an everpresent fixture (37 first division games in 1999–2000 and rarely missing a match from 2002 to 2005).

After two Segunda División campaigns, contributing with five games to another promotion to the top flight in the latter, Valcarce retired in July 2008 at nearly 34, and joined Málaga's football directory.

Honours
Málaga
UEFA Intertoto Cup: 2002

References

External links

1974 births
Living people
People from Arrecife
Sportspeople from the Province of Las Palmas
Spanish footballers
Footballers from the Canary Islands
Association football defenders
La Liga players
Segunda División players
Segunda División B players
Real Madrid C footballers
Real Madrid Castilla footballers
Málaga CF players